The Evangelical International Church of the Soldiers of the Cross of Christ (also known as the Soldiers of the Cross Church) is a Pentecostal Christian denomination.

History
It was organized in 1922 by an American businessman named Ernest William Sellers, who began holding evening religious services at his place of business in Havana, Cuba. After receiving a visit from a missionary named George Smith, Sellers was persuaded to organize a more active effort to evangelize Cuba with what he considered to be the proper understanding of the Bible. Sellers enthusiastically recruited and sent missionaries throughout the island of Cuba, and served as the church’s spiritual leader during the remainder of his life.

After Sellers' death, the church spread to other nations in Central and South America, and eventually relocated its headquarters to Miami, Florida, from where it currently operates. The church currently has missions in over 25 countries.

Beliefs and practices
The Soldiers of the Cross of Christ Church has many core beliefs in common with most evangelical Christian churches. They believe in the one true God, creator of heaven and earth, who eternally exists in three distinct persons: Father, Son and Holy Spirit. They believe the Bible to be the authoritative word of God, and in gifts of the Spirit and prophecy. However, there are many important areas of difference. For example, they observe the biblical seventh day Sabbath on Saturday and follow the commandment to not eat unclean foods

See also
Missionary Church of the Disciples of Jesus Christ

References

Pentecostal denominations
Seventh-day denominations
1920s establishments in Cuba